Heteropriacanthus, the glasseyes or glass bigeyes, are a genus of the bigeye family found in all tropical seas around the world. It occasionally makes its way into the aquarium trade.

The glasseyes has been classified in a single species, Heteropriacanthus cruentatus, but recent morphological and genetic analysis indicates that glasseyes may be better divided into three species: Heteropriacanthus cruentatus (Atlantic Ocean and southwest Indian Ocean), H. fulgens (northeastern Atlantic), and H. carolinus (Indo-Pacific). H.cruentatus can differentiated from the rest of its genus by looking at its caudal and anal fin in which is distinct in colour.

References

External links
 

Priacanthidae
Fish described in 1801
Fish of Hawaii
Fish of Palau
Fish of the Atlantic Ocean